Protestants in Mozambique are part of a variety of denominations. Since the Portuguese colonial period in Mozambique, the Catholic Church has been the main Christian group in the country, followed by various Protestant mission churches and African Independent Churches (AICs). The results of the last census show that Catholicism is no longer the most important religion in the southern provinces of Maputo, Gaza and Inhambane. Zion believers, belonging to the largest AICs, constitute the majority of the population, exceeding the Catholics. Looking at the whole of Mozambique, Zionism is the third religion, representing 16 per cent of the total population, only surpassed by Catholicism (28%) and Islam (18%). For the first time, Evangelicals and Pentecostals were counted together as one separate category in the 2007 Census, representing 11 per cent of the total population and thus are the fourth religious group in the country.

Among the main protestant churches in Mozambique are Igreja União Baptista de Moçambique, the Labourers Chapel Mozambique, the Assembleias de Deus, the Seventh-day Adventist Church, the Anglican Diocese of Lemombo, Anglican Diocese of Niassa, the Igreja do Evangelho Completo de Deus, the Igreja Metodista Unida, the Igreja Presbiteriana de Moçambique, the Igrejas de Cristo and the Assembleias Evangélicas de Deus Pentecostais. There is a small Lutheran church, the Evangelical Lutheran Church in Mozambique.

References

 
Mozambique